Lakhon Mein Aik is a 1967 Pakistani romantic musical film directed by Raza Mir and written by Zia Sarhadi. Set 20 years after the partition of India, the film stars Shamim Ara and Ijaz as star-crossed lovers. It was released on 28 April 1967 and became a commercial success, winning six Nigar Awards including Best Actress for Shamim Ara.

Plot 

In 1947, following the partition of India, communal riots emerge in Kashmir. A Hindu family tries to flee to India but is accidentally separated from their young daughter, Shakuntala. Shakuntala and a Muslim boy Mahmood fall in love but then they are separated and feel agony while they are separated.

Cast 
 Shamim Ara as Shakuntala
 Baby Sabrina as Shakuntala (young)
 Ijaz as Mahmood / Dildar Khan
 Master Mahmood as Dildar Khan (young)
 Talish as Ahmed Ali
 Saqi as Dilbar Khan, the Pathan truck driver
 Mustafa Qureshi as Madhu Sudhan Laal

Production 
In Bollywood, Zia Sarhadi was known for his films Hum Log (1951) and Foothoath (1953). After his migration to Pakistan, he wrote the story of Lakhon Mein Aik, based on a cross-border romance. Raza Mir directed the film who co-produced it also with Afzal Hussain. Cinematography was handled by Kamran Mirza, and editing by Rehmat Ali. Mustafa Qureshi made his debut with this film. He was approached by Mir to play the villainous role in the film, when Mir spotted him during the filming of Aag Ka Darya (1966).

Themes 
Lakhon Mein Aik is set 20 years after the partition of India which happened in 1947, though historian Karan Bali notes that the events of 1947 "play a key role in kick-starting the doomed Indo-Pak love story". He also considers that though Pakistani people view the film as unbiased and balanced, from an Indian perspective it "does not really appear quite as so" since the majority of Muslim characters are portrayed as sympathetic, and "every Hindu, barring the heroine and her father, is seen as negative or evil".

Soundtrack 
The soundtrack was composed by Nisar Bazmi.

Release and reception 
Lakhon Mein Aik was released on 28 April 1967 and became a commercial success. Filmman of The Statesman said it "does make a departure from the general run of Urdu films but somehow clings to the hackneyed twists and turns.

Accolades 
The film won in six categories at the Pakistani Nigar Awards:
Best Actress for Shamim Ara
 Best Supporting Actor for Saqi
 Best Sound
 Best Camera work
 Best Female Singer for Noor Jehan
 Best Lyricist for Fayyaz Hashmi.

Legacy and impact 
The cross-border romance theme of Lakhon Mein Aik later inspired the Indian filmmaker Raj Kapoor with the idea of the film Henna (1991). The film was adapted by Sangeeta as a television series which aired on TV One.

Lakhon Mein Aik was the debut film of Mustafa Qureshi, it launched his career in Urdu films after which he went on to become a famous star of the Punjabi films.

BBC Urdu included it among the "Top ten best films of the Pakistani cinema", selected by critic Aijaz Gul. It was also included in another list by Gul which was published in "Asian Film Journeys: Selection from Cinemaya".

References

External links 
 

1960s romantic musical films
1960s Urdu-language films
Films scored by Nisar Bazmi
Films set in the partition of India
Nigar Award winners
Pakistani black-and-white films
Pakistani romantic musical films
Urdu-language Pakistani films